Dvir Benedek (born 29 December 1969) is an Israeli actor. He is chairman of the Israeli screen actors union Shaham.

Biography
Dvir Benedek lives in Givatayim with his wife Irit Natan Benedek and their daughter, Yuli, born in 2010.

Acting and media career

Theatre
Benedek appeared in Israeli plays such as Gever Isha Milim, Miskhakey Hevra, Revizor, 4 on 4, In Habima Theatre: Hadibuk, Kadish Le Neomy, The Good Soldier Švejk, Tango, Perurim, and Driving Miss Daisy (play).
In 2008, Benedek won the Best supporting actor award on behalf of Habima Theatre. Benedek was also the first non-English speaking actor portraying Shrek in the Israeli production of Shrek The Musical.

Television
Benedek starred in the television series Shaul, Haretzua, Sibat Hamavet: Retakh, My first Sony, Zimerim, Hanefilim, Gam Lahem Magia, Quicky. In 2008, Bendek participated in the Israeli television series Makom Ledeaaga, Hakira Pnimit and Papadizzi.

In 2010, Benedek participated in the television series Taxi Driver and was announced to feature as the lead character in HaMisrad, an Israeli version of The Office, as Avi Meshulam (a revision of the original British series' lead character David Brent). In 2020, Benedek anonymously participated in the Israeli production of The Masked Singer as The Shark.

Film
Benedek co-starred in the movies Maya, Kirot, Kalat Hayam, A Matter of Size, Seret hatuna (2006), Yomuledet (2005), Eize Makom Nifla, 'Yeladim Tovim', 'Hamesh Dakot BeHalicha', Lemon Popsicle 9: The Party Goes On, Mars Turkey, D.F.1: The Lost Patrol, Mivtza Savta, Zman Avir and The Attack (2012).

Voice acting
Benedek voiced Mr. Conductor in Thomas and the Magic Railroad, Aslan in The Chronicles of Narnia, Nigel in The Wild, and Po the Panda in Kung Fu Panda.

Awards and recognition
Benedek won the Best Actor Award at the Seoul Drama Awards Festival 2008, for his role in the TV film Hahonech (The Tutor)

See also
Theater of Israel
Television in Israel

References

External links
 

1969 births
Living people
Israeli male film actors
Israeli male television actors
Israeli male voice actors
Jewish Israeli male actors
People from Kiryat Yam